The coursers are a group of birds which together with the pratincoles make up the family Glareolidae.  They have long legs, short wings and long pointed bills which curve downwards. Their most unusual feature for birds classed as waders is that they inhabit deserts and similar arid regions.

They have cryptic plumage and crouch down when alarmed to avoid detection by predators.

Like the pratincoles, the coursers are found in warmer parts of the Old World. They hunt insects by running.

Their 2–3 eggs are laid on the ground.

Species in taxonomic order

Cream-colored courser Cursorius cursor
Somali courser Cursorius somalensis
Temminck's courser Cursorius temminckii 
Indian courser Cursorius coromandelius
Burchell's courser Cursorius rufus
Double-banded courser or two-banded courser, Rhinoptilus africanus
Three-banded courser or Heuglin's courser,  Rhinoptilus cinctus
Bronze-winged courser or violet-tipped courser, Rhinoptilus chalcopterus
Jerdon's courser  Rhinoptilus bitorquatus

References

 Hayman, Marchant and Prater, Shorebirds 

Glareolidae